The 2022–23 2. Bundesliga is the 49th season of the 2. Bundesliga. It began on 15 July 2022 and concludes on 28 May 2023.

The fixtures were announced on 17 June 2022.

Teams

Team changes

Stadiums and locations

Personnel and kits

Managerial changes

League table

Results

Relegation play-offs
The relegation play-offs will take place on 31 May or 2 June and 6 or 7 June 2023.

Statistics

Top goalscorers

Hat-tricks

4 Player scored four goals.

Top assists

Clean sheets

Number of teams by state

References

External links

2. Bundesliga seasons
2
Germany
Germany, 2